Scott Hammond (born 4 June 1973) is an English drummer. He plays with Ian Anderson (the leader and frontman of British Rock band Jethro Tull) and has also toured and recorded with Jethro Tull itself. He has been described as a "Jazz drummer with rock influences".

Early years
Hammond was born in Bristol, England, UK. He started to learn the drums when he was 14 years old and later studied at The City of Leeds College of Music for three years, and also with Dave Hassell for two years.

Ian Anderson

Since April 2010 Hammond has primarily been touring internationally with Ian Anderson, rock flautist of Jethro Tull. Recordings with Ian Anderson have included Thick As a Brick 2 album (released in April 2012) - the sequel to Jethro Tull's 1972 album Thick As A Brick. Hammond's touring with the band has included the "Thick As A Brick" 2012/13 world tour, the 2014/15 Homo Erraticus world tour, Jethro Tull - The Rock Opera and Jethro Tull's 50th Anniversary tour in 2018.

Jethro Tull

In March 2011 Hammond toured with Jethro Tull in Ireland. This tour featured Martin Barre on guitar, David Goodier on bass, John O'Hara on keyboards and Ian Anderson on flute, guitar and vocals. From 2017 he is in a new line-up of Jethro Tull.

Hammond said in an interview: "I wouldn't describe myself as a prog rock drummer although it's obviously a part of what I do. My rock roots are based in bands like Deep Purple although I have always enjoyed listening to Jethro Tull's Minstrel in the Gallery since I was a teenager."
 
In the book "The Ballad of Jethro Tull", Hammond said "What attracted me (to Jethro Tull) was the variation in dynamics and the quirky arrangements. It was exciting."

Hammond's first studio album with Jethro Tull, The Zealot Gene, was released on January 28, 2022. He also played on Jethro Tull's 23rd album which is due to be released in the Spring of 2023.

Freelance career
The majority of Hammond's working life has been jazz and funk based. He plays very regularly with his own band JINGU BANG and also with the jazz organ trio The Hopkins-Hammond Trio. Other artists he has worked with include Ruth Hammond, Bruce Dickinson, Greg Lake, Justin Hayward, Tina May, Gilbert O'Sullivan, Herb Geller, Bobby Wellins, Pee Wee Ellis, Phil King and Limahl. More recently Hammond has featured on four albums by UK based trumpeter Ben Thomas with Thomas & Muse.

Hammond was voted 5th best rock drummer in the world in the 2022 MusicRadar Awards (public vote)

Discography

References

1973 births
Living people
British male drummers
English rock drummers
21st-century drummers
21st-century British male musicians